The Albert Ball Memorial Homes were erected in 1922  in Lenton, Nottingham.

Alderman Albert Ball commissioned the building of the Albert Ball Memorial Homes in Lenton to house the families of local servicemen killed in action, in memory of his son, Albert Ball, a fighter pilot who had been killed in World War I.

Opened on 7 September 1922, the homes featured some unusual design elements. The building, containing eight residences, was built to evoke an aircraft, with the homes the wings, and the central porch reminiscent of a cockpit. The two centre homes had curving doors, windows, and walls that also fit the theme. Windows on the row are suggestive of propellers. They were also built with ease of use for the elderly in mind. The Albert Ball Memorial Homes were Grade-II listed in 1995.

War memorial

The Lenton War Memorial, located in front of the homes, includes Ball's name and was also paid for by the Ball family.

References

Grade II* listed buildings in Nottinghamshire
Buildings and structures in Nottingham
Houses completed in 1922
Grade II listed almshouses
Monuments and memorials in Nottinghamshire
Almshouses in Nottingham